Edward Best may refer to:

 Edward Mark Best (1899–1941), New Zealand police officer
 Ted Best (Edward Best, 1917–1992), Australian athlete
 Teddy Best (Edward Best, 1874–1957), Australian rules footballer
 Ted Best, a character in the 1982 film Bad Blood